Rukometni klub Partizan (previously RK Boka) is a Montenegrin handball club from Tivat that plays in Montenegrin First League.

History

The first handball club from Tivat, RK Partizan, was formed in 1949. Between the 1950s and 1990s, it competed in a number of different leagues, mostly in the Second League.

During FR Yugoslavia and Serbia and Montenegro, RK Partizan was renamed RK Tivat. The team participated in the Second Yugoslav League - 'West' and in the Montenegrin Republic League.

In 2005, RK Tivat and RK Kotor, from the nearest city of Kotor, were merged into one club. The new club, a successor of RK Tivat, was named RK Boka. RK Boka played their first season in the Montenegrin First League in 2006.

The club was renamed during the summer of 2014, returning to the old name RK Partizan.

European record

First League seasons

RK Partizan played in the Montenegrin First League during the seasons 2006/07, 2007/08, 2013/14, 2014/15.

External links
RK Partizan 1949 Tivat 
Handball Federation of Montenegro

Boka
Handball clubs established in 1949
1949 establishments in Yugoslavia
Tivat